Judith Anna Roberts (born December 1, 1934) is an American actress, best known for her roles as Mary Shaw in James Wan's horror film Dead Silence (2007), and as Taslitz, one of  "The Golden Girls", in the Netflix comedy-drama series Orange Is the New Black.

Acting career
Her first film role was 1977 in Eraserhead. In the following years she appeared in a few other small roles in films and TV series, including Law & Order and Law & Order: Criminal Intent. Her most notable role was Mary Shaw in James Wan's horror film Dead Silence in 2007. That same year, Roberts collaborated with Wan again in his film Death Sentence, playing Judge Shaw.

In 2013, Roberts appeared in Justin Timberlake's music video for "Mirrors". In 2014, she had the recurring role in the Netflix comedy-drama series Orange Is the New Black. Along with the cast, Roberts received the Screen Actors Guild Award for Outstanding Performance by an Ensemble in a Comedy Series. In 2015, she performed on Broadway in the play Airline Highway.

Personal life 
Roberts was married to actor Pernell Roberts from 1962 to 1971.

Filmography

References

External links

 

1934 births
Living people
American film actresses
Actresses from New York City
American television actresses
20th-century American actresses
21st-century American actresses
Place of birth missing (living people)